"Philadelphia Freedom" is a song by English musician Elton John and songwriter Bernie Taupin. It was released as a single in 1975, credited to The Elton John Band. The song was the fourth of John's six number 1 US hits during the early and mid-1970s, which saw his recordings dominating the charts. In Canada it was his eighth single to hit the top of the RPM national singles chart.

The song was written by John and Taupin as a favour to John's friend, tennis star Billie Jean King, who was part of the Philadelphia Freedoms professional tennis team. The song features an orchestral arrangement by Gene Page which includes flutes, horns, and strings.

The song made its album debut on 1977's Elton John's Greatest Hits Volume II. The unedited version (without an early fade out) appears on the box set To Be Continued... and the 40th anniversary edition of the Goodbye Yellow Brick Road album.

Background
Recorded in the summer of 1974, during breaks between sessions for Captain Fantastic and the Brown Dirt Cowboy, the song was at the time the only song Elton John and Bernie Taupin had ever consciously written as a single, as John told journalist Paul Gambaccini. John was looking to honour Billie Jean King, and so asked Taupin to write a song called "Philadelphia Freedom" as a homage to her tennis team, the Philadelphia Freedoms.

In His Song: The Musical History of Elton John, Elizabeth Rosenthal recounts that Taupin said, "I can't write a song about tennis," and did not. Taupin maintains that the lyrics bear no relation to tennis, Philadelphia soul, or even flag-waving patriotism. Nonetheless, the lyrics have been interpreted as patriotic and uplifting, and even though it was released in 1975, the song's sentiment, intentionally or not, meshed perfectly with an American music audience gearing up for the country's bicentennial celebration in July 1976. In the US, the song was certified Gold in 1975 and Platinum in 1995 by the Recording Industry Association of America. Billboard ranked it as the No. 3 song for 1975.

The song was dedicated in part to "the Philadelphia sound," which included the soul music of the Delfonics and the Spinners and the talents of writer-producers Kenny Gamble, Leon Huff, and Thom Bell; John would work with Bell two years later on an EP that came to be known as The Thom Bell Sessions. "Philadelphia Freedom" plays in Philadelphia's Franklin Institute IMAX Theater before every show as a tribute to the city's love for freedom and its impact on the country. The lyrics are also printed on the walls of the Hard Rock Cafe in Philadelphia.

The B-side, "I Saw Her Standing There", is a live recording of the Elton John Band with John Lennon at Madison Square Garden on 28 November 1974. It was the last of three songs John and Lennon performed together that night – the performance would mark Lennon's last concert appearance. Three songs from that collaboration were featured on the 1975 12" EP Elton John Band featuring John Lennon and the Muscle Shoals Horns (DJM). These recordings can also be found on the Lennon box set and the remastered edition of John's Here and There album.

Reception
Cash Box said that it has  "a thumping heartbeat," "big production," "soaring strings and bleating horns."  Record World said that "Gene Page charts provide local color for EJ's latest not-available-on-lp smash."

Billie Jean King 
Elton John met Billie Jean King in 1973 and, according to reporters for CNN, they have since built a "powerful partnership in philanthropy, raising hundreds of millions of dollars...for equal rights and for HIV/AIDS causes."
Upon admiring and meeting King, John asked his long-term writing partner Bernie Taupin to write the lyrics to what became "Philadelphia Freedom" and dedicate it to his friend, King, who was a member of the Philadelphia Freedoms tennis team. The label on the vinyl for this record reads "with Love to B.J.K. and the sound of Philadelphia." At the time, King had just been ranked the "World Number 1 women's player" for the fifth time in the previous seven years. Additionally, one reporter argued that she had "alter[ed] the gender perception of professional tennis with her victory against Bobby Riggs in a highly-publicized 'Battle of the Sexes' exhibition match."

The lyrics of "Philadelphia Freedom" are not explicitly about the match or King, but stem from a love of King and her cause. Prior to their match, Riggs claimed that even as a 55-year-old man, he could still beat a woman (King was 29 at the time) in a tennis match because it was a man's game. The match was held on 20 September 1973 at the Astrodome in Houston and was telecast worldwide. Though usually cheering from the sidelines at every match, John lost his voice cheering King on from a Los Angeles hotel. The year before the "Battle of the Sexes" match, Congress adopted the Equal Rights Amendment and 1973 saw the decision of Roe v. Wade give women the right to choose to have an abortion. King made other steps in feminism in 1973 when she founded the Women's Tennis Association and "convinced the U.S. Open to award female champions the same prize money as men." This set the scene for King's match and victory against Riggs.

The win ignited even more advocacy efforts for sexual equality, shattered the stereotype Riggs had presented and, as feminist Gloria Steinem put it, "provided...a morale change." King is now known as a "champion for social change and equal rights."

Despite her success in the match and its historical importance, King told eltonjohn.com that they (she and Elton) did not want the song to be about tennis. "It's a feeling," she said. King and John also co-founded the World Team Tennis Smash Hits, a charity function benefitting AIDS charities. King spoke of her work with Elton, saying "We're out there every single day with our energy and we're going to make this world a better place, no matter if it's through tennis, through music, whatever, to try to help the LGBT community, just help humanity."

Chart performance

Weekly charts

Year-end charts

All-time charts

Certifications

Personnel
 Elton John – electric piano, vocals
 Ray Cooper – tambourine, maracas, congas
 Davey Johnstone – electric and acoustic guitars
 Dee Murray – bass
 Nigel Olsson – drums
 Gene Page – orchestral arrangement

Cover versions and live recordings 
The song was covered in 1975 by MFSB on their album of the same name on Philadelphia International Records.

A version was recorded by Esther Phillips on her 1979 LP – Here's Esther...Are You Ready released on Mercury Records.

The song was covered by Hall & Oates on their 1991 tribute album Two Rooms.

Live recordings include a full band version on One Night Only – The Greatest Hits and a solo piano version on Live at Madison Square Garden, an exclusive CD released to Rocket Fan Club members.

Notes

References

External links
 Lyrics of this song at berniejtaupin.com
 

Billie Jean King
1975 singles
American patriotic songs
Elton John songs
Billboard Hot 100 number-one singles
Cashbox number-one singles
Songs about Philadelphia
Songs with music by Elton John
Songs with lyrics by Bernie Taupin
1975 songs
DJM Records singles
United States Bicentennial
MCA Records singles
Songs about Pennsylvania
RPM Top Singles number-one singles